André Van Nieuwkerke (born 1953) is a Belgian politician and a member of the Socialistische Partij Anders. He was elected as a member of the Belgian Senate in 2007.

Notes

Living people
Socialistische Partij Anders politicians
Members of the Belgian Federal Parliament
1953 births